Mehram is a Pakistani television series aired at Hum TV from 29 November 2014 to 15 January 2015. It stars Ayesha Khan and Zahid Ahmed in leading roles, along with Agha Ali and Moammar Rana in supporting roles. The serial was a critical and commercial success and earned several nominations with Ayesha Khan who was nominated for Hum Award for Best Actress Popular and Hum Award for Best Actress, and Zahid Ahmed was nominated for Hum Award for Best Television Sensation Male.

Synopsis
Mehram uncovers the story of an unobtrusive family, where Hamza is living with his brother's dowager Iqra, subsequently of which they turn into the brunt of doubts. Hamza has ample respect for Iqra, yet they covertly ties knot to hush all the idle discussions. Not long after their paper marriage, Iqra understands that Hamza needs somebody he adores, and demands him wedding Maya, for whom Hamza has sentiments. The story takes a turn as Maya and Hamza marry and Maya finds about his paper marriage to Iqra. Maya leave the house saying she can't live in the same house as his first wife   and he have to choose between her and Iqra. Seeing the tension between the newly wed couple Iqra also leave the house. Hamza  became mentally disturbed and try to shoot himself after which both started to look after him until he recovers. After recovering Maya asked him to choose between her and Iqra. Iqra again leave the house and  starts living with his father. Meanwhile, at the request of Iqra, Hamza decides to divorce her. But later that day Iqra's father dies. Hamza decides to not divorce her and bring her back but when he came to Iqra's house he found that she already left. After some years, Hamza and Maya have a daughter. And Iqra starts to publish her poetry to earn a living.

Cast 
Ayesha Khan as Iqra
Zahid Ahmed as Hamza
Moammar Rana as Hamza's older brother
Agha Ali as Areeb
Sajida Syed 
Hina Rizvi as Habiba
Ayesha Khan as Faiza
Erum Azam as Iqra's sister

References

External links 
 

Urdu-language telenovelas
Pakistani telenovelas
Pakistani drama television series
2014 Pakistani television series debuts
2015 Pakistani television series endings
Hum TV original programming
Hum TV